William Ralph Latham (17 October 1924 – 11 June 2012) was an Australian rules footballer who played with Melbourne in the Victorian Football League (VFL) and West Perth and Swan Districts in the West Australian Football League.

Notes

External links 

Ralph Latham's playing statistics from WAFL Footy Facts

1924 births
Australian rules footballers from Western Australia
Melbourne Football Club players
West Perth Football Club players
Swan Districts Football Club players
2012 deaths